Magdeborn was a village and a municipality south of Leipzig, Germany. It was in its last form a group of seven villages, named for Magdeborn which consisted only of church, vicary and school, which had served all of them. The name is derived from the castle Medeburu which was first mentioned in 969.

Around 1940 a large housing area was added for workers of the brown coal mining in Espenhain. Between 1977 and 1980 Magdeborn had to give way to the mining, after all inhabitants (ca. 3200) had been moved from the end of the 1960s. Its area was added to the municipality of Störmthal.

References

External links 

 Magdeborn private website
 Das Projekt Vineta, art based on the former church, Großpösna
 Das Kunstobjekt „VINETA“ nimmt Gestalt an bauplan-potel.de
 Kunst statt Kohle

Former villages in Germany
Former municipalities in Saxony
Leipzig (district)